James Lawrence Begley (September 19, 1902 – February 22, 1957), nicknamed "Imp", was a Major League Baseball player. Begley played for the Cincinnati Reds in the 1924 season. In two games, he had one hit in five at-bats, with two walks. Begley batted and threw right-handed.

He was born and died in San Francisco, California.

Begley attended the University of San Francisco.

External links

1902 births
1957 deaths
Baseball players from San Francisco
Cincinnati Reds players
San Francisco Dons baseball players